United Nations Security Council resolution 901 was adopted unanimously on 4 March 1994. After reaffirming resolutions 849 (1993), 854 (1993), 858 (1993), 876 (1993), 881 (1993), 892 (1993) and 896 (1994), the council extended the mandate of the United Nations Observer Mission in Georgia (UNOMIG) until 31 March 1994.

The council noted the negotiations to be held in New York City on 7 March 1994 following talks held in Geneva on 22–24 February 1994, between the Georgian and Abkhaz sides, urging both to achieve progress as soon as possible so that the council could consider the establishment of a peace-keeping force in Abkhazia. Secretary-General Boutros Boutros-Ghali was requested to report back to the council by 21 March 1994 on developments in the negotiations and situation on the ground.

See also
 Abkhaz–Georgian conflict
 List of United Nations Security Council Resolutions 901 to 1000 (1994–1995)
 United Nations resolutions on Abkhazia
 War in Abkhazia (1992–1993)

References

External links
 
Text of the Resolution at undocs.org

 0901
Abkhaz–Georgian conflict
1994 in Georgia (country)
1994 in Abkhazia
 0901
March 1994 events